The Army Battle School is a combat training institution of the Namibian Army. It was created in 1996, and is located at the Oshivelo Military Base, Walvis Bay.

History
Recognizing the need to ensure that Units and Formations perfect and enhance their fighting effectiveness and maintain the required standard of professionalism the School was set up in 1996.

Location
The school is located at the Oshivelo Military Base, Oshivelo.

Training
Courses offered at the school are the:
Company Group Commander Course(CGC)
Platoon commander Course(PCC)
Platoon Sergeant Course
Section Commanders Course

Facilities
The Germany government has assisted with the motor vehicle workshop and installation of a sick bay.

Leadership

Notes

References

Military of Namibia